Colombia competed at the 1980 Summer Olympics in Moscow, USSR.

Results and competitors by event

Athletics
Men's 10,000 metres
Domingo Tibaduiza
 Heat — did not finish (→ did not advance)

Men's Marathon
 Domingo Tibaduiza
 Final — 2:17:06 (→ 17th place)
 Luis Barbosa
 Final — 2:22:58 (→ 34th place)

Men's 20 km Walk
 Enrique Peña
 Final — 1:38:00.0 (→ 17th place)
 Ernesto Alfaro
 Final — 1:42:19.7 (→ 19th place)

Men's 50 km Walk
 Enrique Peña
 Final — 4:29:27 (→ 14th place)
 Ernesto Alfaro
 Final — 4:46:28 (→ 15th place)

Football

Men's Team Competition
 Preliminary Round (Group B)
 Lost to Czechoslovakia (0-3)
 Drew with Kuwait (1-1)
 Defeated Nigeria (1-0)
 Quarter Final
 Did not advance
Team Roster
Head coach: Eduardo Retat

Swimming
Men's 100m Breaststroke
 Pablo Restrepo
 Final — 1.05,91 (→ 7th place)

See also
Sports in Colombia

References
Official Olympic Reports
sports-reference

Nations at the 1980 Summer Olympics
1980 Summer Olympics
Olympics